Norman Mackay (26 May 1902 – after 1935) was a Scottish professional footballer who played in the Football League for Aston Villa, Plymouth Argyle and Southend United. He played as a right half or inside right.

Mackay was born in Edinburgh. He played for Edinburgh Royal and Broxburn United, and was on the books of Blackburn Rovers (without playing in the League) and Hibernian, before signing for Aston Villa in 1923. He made his Football League debut for Villa in the 1923–24 season, but appeared only twice for the club before moving on to Western League club Lovells Athletic. He returned to his native Scotland where he played for Junior club Yoker Athletic and had a trial with Scottish League club Clydebank, then came back to England where he joined Plymouth Argyle. He went on to make 241 appearances for the club in all competitions, and was a regular choice for the first team for six seasons from 1928–29 onwards. His last appearance for the first team came in May 1934, after which he spent a season with Southend United before returning to Scotland where he joined Clydebank Juniors.

References

External links 
Norman Mackay, www.ihibs.co.uk

1902 births
Year of death missing
Footballers from Edinburgh
Scottish footballers
Association football midfielders
Broxburn United F.C. players
Blackburn Rovers F.C. players
Hibernian F.C. players
Aston Villa F.C. players
Lovell's Athletic F.C. players
Plymouth Argyle F.C. players
Southend United F.C. players
Clydebank Juniors F.C. players
Scottish Football League players
English Football League players
Scottish Junior Football Association players
Place of death missing
Yoker Athletic F.C. players